The 2001 Tenneco Automotive Grand Prix of Detroit was a Championship Auto Racing Teams (CART) race that was held on June 17, 2001 on the Raceway on Belle Isle in Detroit, Michigan for the final time for CART. It was the seventh race of the 2001 CART season. The race was won for the second consecutive year by Hélio Castroneves for Team Penske. Dario Franchitti finished second, and Roberto Moreno clinched third.

There were four cautions, totaling 14 laps during the race. It was Castroneves's second victory of the 2001 season, and the fifth of his CART career. Of the 25 drivers that started, 13 were listed as running at the end of the race; six retired after contact, and six retired with mechanical issues.

Report 

Hélio Castroneves (Team Penske) returned to the site of his first victory in CART. After securing pole position he led every lap during the race to win the Detroit Grand Prix. Castroneves scored the maximum of 22 Championship points (20 for first place, 1 for Pole, 1 for leading most laps) which moved him within 5 points of Kenny Bräck (Team Rahal), series leader at that time. Dario Franchitti (Team Green) finished second. It was his first podium finish in 2001. Roberto Moreno (Patrick Racing) completed the podium to finish in third position. Michael Andretti (Team Green/Motorola) and Christian Fittipaldi (Newman-Haas Racing) followed in fourth and fifth position respectively.

The race ended early for Alex Zanardi (Mo Nunn) and Michel Jourdain Jr. (Bettenhausen Racing) after a collision in lap 3. Zanardi later expressed in an interview during ABC's coverage that he was not very happy with handling of the car and did not see Jourdain coming. Zanardi's teammate Tony Kanaan was withdrawn prior to the race after suffering a concussion during qualifying.

Max Wilson (Arciero-Blair Racing) and Scott Dixon (PacWest) suffered from gearbox problems which ended their race in lap 36 and 37 respectively . Alex Tagliani (Forsythe) collided with the wall in lap 39. He later reported that his brake did not work which resulted in a heavy impact. His foot got stuck between the pedals of his car.

Ganassi drivers Minassian and Junqueira also suffered from mechanical damage on their Toyota Lolas after the first round of pit stops, Minassian was fired from Chip Ganassi Racing after race being replaced by Memo Gidley from the stage of Portland. Jimmy Vasser (Patrick Racing) lost control of his car while trying to get heat in the tires during the pace car period in lap 43. Also, Oriol Servià (Sigma Autosport) and Bryan Herta (Forsythe Racing) made contact with the wall which ended their races effectively in laps 56 and 61 respectively.

In the penultimate lap Paul Tracy (Team Green) ran out of fuel after having stopped earlier than any of his competitors which dropped him out of any point scoring position finishing in 14th position.

Classification

Race results

– Includes two bonus points for leading the most laps and being the fastest qualifier.

Standings after the race

Drivers' Championship

Constructors' standings

Manufacturer's Standings

References 

Detroit Grand Prix
2001 in sports in Michigan
Detroit Indy Grand Prix
2001 in Detroit